The 2017–18 Iraqi Premier League was the 44th season of the Iraqi Premier League, the highest division for Iraqi association football clubs, since its establishment in 1974. The season started on 20 November 2017, and ended on 18 July 2018. Al-Zawraa won a record 14th title, finishing four points ahead of both the previous season's champions and runners-up (Al-Quwa Al-Jawiya and Al-Naft respectively) and five points ahead of Al-Shorta.

Teams

League table

Results

Season statistics

Top scorers

Hat-tricks

Awards

See also
2017 Iraqi Super Cup

References

External links
 Iraq Football Association

Iraqi Premier League seasons
1
Iraq